The system of orders, decorations, and medals of the Republic of Kazakhstan has its origins in the Law of the Republic of Kazakhstan No. 2676 dated December 12, 1995 titled "On State Awards of the Republic of Kazakhstan." Awards have been modified and added over time. The system has similarities to other countries that were formerly part of the Soviet Union.

Highest awards

Orders of the Republic of Kazakhstan

Medals of the Republic of Kazakhstan

References

External links

State Awards Kazakhstan state awards. Medals. Highest Decorations

 
Kazakhstan